Rumana Rashid Ishita is a Bangladeshi television actress, director, and writer. She won the national talent competition, Notun Kuri, as a child artiste in 1988.

Education
Ishita completed her bachelor's in 2004 and later completed her MBA. She is a former student of Holy Cross Girl's School and College.

Career
In 2007, Ishita served as a marketing executive of the television channel Channel i and worked for 11 years. She is also a faculty member of a private university.

Personal life
Ishita is a restaurateur. Singer Firoza Begum was her aunt-in-law.

Works
 Ghotona Samanyo (1997)
 Nirjon Aranye
 Swapno Swapneel 
 Godhuli Belaye
 Firey Ase Fire Asa
 Bipashar Jonno Bhalobasha (2002)
 Aparoopa (2005)
 Pata Jhorar Din (2018)

Awards and nominations
Meril-Prothom Alo Awards

References

External links

 

Year of birth missing (living people)
Date of birth missing (living people)
Place of birth missing (living people)
Living people
Bangladeshi television actresses
Bangladeshi television directors
Bangladeshi women writers
Women television directors